Michael Uwezu  (born 12 December 1990) is a Nigerian footballer who plays for Ashford United. He began his career at Fulham and has also played for Lincoln City, Forest Green Rovers and FC Linköping City in Sweden.

Career

Early career
Born in Irete, Imo State, Uwezu began his career with Arsenal's academy before moving to their London rivals Fulham. Michael can play wide or as a central striker and signed his first professional contract with Fulham at the end of the 2008–09 season after scoring 11 goals in 18 games for the Academy Under-18s that season.

Fulham
At the beginning of the 2009–10 season, Uwezu was given the number 40 shirt. He was an unused substitute three times for Fulham's Europa League group matches against CSKA Sofia (home and away), and FC Basel (away).

He was sent on a month loan to Lincoln City on 1 January 2010, along with Matthew Saunders. He made his first senior appearance and debut the following day in a 4–0 loss to Bolton Wanderers in the FA Cup third round, coming on as a substitute for Lenell John-Lewis.

Uwezu returned to Fulham on 1 February 2010, after appearing twice for Lincoln in the league and once in the FA Cup.
 He then continued his good form for Fulham's reserve side, scoring two goals in four games towards the end of the season, and this form was good enough for him to be given a trial at Carlisle United, with an eye to a loan move for the 2010–11 season. On 1 July 2010, Fulham announced that Uwezu had been released from his contract with Fulham. He made no senior appearances for the club.

Forest Green Rovers

On 6 August 2011, Uwezu featured as a trialist for Forest Green Rovers in a 2–1 win over Gloucester City. And on 3 November 2011, Uwezu signed a short-term contract with Forest Green. Uwezu made his Forest Green debut on 5 November 2011 coming on as a substitute in Forest Green's home win over Alfreton Town.

On 6 January 2012, Uwezu signed an extended contract at The New Lawn after impressing in his first two months with the club. On 3 March 2012, Uwezu scored his first goal for Forest Green in a 2–1 home win against Cambridge United. At the end of the season Uwezu was released by Forest Green.

Thamesmead Town
In the 2014–15 season Uwezu played for Thamesmead Town in the Isthmian League Division One North.

FC Linköping City
In 2016, Uwezu moved abroad for the first time in his career, signing with Swedish fourth-tier club FC Linköping City. He played 65 league games for the club, scoring 27 goals and occasionally captaining the side, before leaving at the end of the 2018 season.

East Grinstead Town
Uwezu joined Isthmian League side East Grinstead Town in January 2020.

Burgess Hill Town
Uwezu joined Burgess Hill Town in August 2021.

Ashford United
In May 2022, Uwezu joined Ashford United.

Career statistics

References

External links

BBC Sport profile

1990 births
Living people
Nigerian footballers
Sportspeople from Imo State
English footballers
Association football forwards
Fulham F.C. players
Lincoln City F.C. players
Dulwich Hamlet F.C. players
Northampton Town F.C. players
Forest Green Rovers F.C. players
Thamesmead Town F.C. players
Expatriate footballers in Sweden
FC Linköping City players
East Grinstead Town F.C. players
Burgess Hill Town F.C. players
Ashford United F.C. players
English Football League players
National League (English football) players
Isthmian League players